Frank Thomas Starkey (February 18, 1892 – May 14, 1968) was a U.S. Representative from Minnesota who was born in Saint Paul, Minnesota. Starkey began his political career as business representative of the local Milk Drivers Union from 1917 until 1933 and again in 1942 through 1944. He was a member of the Minnesota House of Representatives from 1923 until 1933, serving as chief clerk in 1933. Starkey was member of the State Industrial Commission from 1933 until 1939 and was vice president of the Minnesota State Federation of Labor for twelve years, serving as director of its research division in 1939 through 1942. He served as member of the Ramsey County Civil Service Commission from 1942 through 1944 and was elected as a Democrat to the 79th congress (1945 until 1947). His bid for reelection in 1946 to the 80th congress was unsuccessful. Starkey was also a writer for trade magazines and commissioner for the Department of Employment Security for a decade starting in 1955. He died in Saint Paul and was cremated; his ashes are interred in Calvary Cemetery, Saint Paul, Minnesota.

References
Minnesota Legislators Past and Present

External links

 

1892 births
1968 deaths
Politicians from Saint Paul, Minnesota
Democratic Party members of the Minnesota House of Representatives
Democratic Party members of the United States House of Representatives from Minnesota
20th-century American politicians